Fuzao (lit. "Impetuous") is the fourth Mandarin-language studio album (thirteenth overall) by Chinese singer Faye Wong. It was released on 3 June 1996 through Cinepoly. Wong took more artistic risks with her work as she approached the end of her record contract, resulting in the experimental nature of Fuzao. The album was positively received by critics, with The Straits Times considering the album as Wong's boldest and most artistically coherent effort to date.

An alternative record, Fuzao was largely written and composed by Wong, with arrangement and production done by her husband, Dou Wei, and Zhang Yadong. The album features two collaborations with the Scottish dream pop band Cocteau Twins, whose sound and aesthetic was a heavy influence.

English names
Translated names used in English-language sources are Restless,
Exasperation,
Anxiety
and Impatience.
The term was widely used in relation to the cultural anxiety of the period.

Composition
As she was approaching the end of her recording contract with Cinepoly, Wong took more artistic risks with this highly experimental album. Some tracks are wordless or use self-created sounds, including the cheerful-sounding refrain "la cha bor" of the title track. It contains mainly her own compositions, with an aesthetic inspired by the Cocteau Twins, who contributed two original songs to the album, "Fracture" (分裂) and "Spoilsport" (掃興). Wong had previously covered their work on Random Thoughts in 1994, and established a remote working relationship with them – even laying down vocals for a special duet version of "Serpentskirt" on the Asian release of the group's 1996 album Milk And Kisses, as her voice blended well with Elizabeth Fraser's ethereal soprano. A Buddhist, Wong weaves teachings of transience and disengagement into the album. These themes can also be found in some of her other albums.

Reception
Paying less attention to the demands of the mainstream market, the album's sales were lower than for Wong's preceding albums. However, Restless was received favorably by critics. The Straits Times considered the album as her boldest and most artistically coherent effort to date. Southern Metropolis Daily described the album as "very harmonious and unified", and stated that the second song, Restless, was similar with Di-Dar albeit simpler.

After the release, Wong became the second Chinese artist (after Gong Li) and the first Chinese singer to be featured on the cover of Time magazine, under the headline "The Divas Of Pop". The title track is featured in the 1998 film Restless.

Packaging
The Hong Kong edition, including the back panel, shows three photos of Faye Wong in the pose of the three wise monkeys.

In 2008, Universal Music re-released the album in a paper ECO Pack as part of its Asian series of 20th Century Masters.

Track listing
All written by Faye Wong, unless otherwise.
 "Wúcháng" (无常), "Sporadic" or "Unusual" — 2:35
 "Fúzào" (浮躁), "Restless" or "Anxiety" — 2:58
 "Xiǎngxiàng" (想像), "Visualize" or "Imagine"  — 3:36
 "Fēnliè" (分裂), "Fracture" or "Divide", composed by Cocteau Twins, lyrics by Lin Xi — 4:00
 "Bùān" (不安), "Uneasy" or "Unstable", instrumental — 2:10
 "Nǎr" (哪兒), "Where" — 3:50
 "Duòluò" (堕落), "Decadence" or "Degenerate" — 3:40
 "Sǎoxìng" (扫兴), "Spoilsport" or "Disappointment", composed by Cocteau Twins, lyrics by Wyman Wong — 4:08
 "Mòrì" (末日), "Doomsday" or "Judgment Day" — 4:00
 "Yesanpo" (野三坡 Yěsānpō), literally "Wild Three Hills" — 3:52
 Based on Yesanpo National Park

References

External links

1996 albums
Faye Wong albums
Cinepoly Records albums
Mandarin-language albums